Pier Luigi Romita (27 July 1924 – 23 March 2003) was an Italian politician who was several times a minister of the Italian Republic.

Biography
Romita was born in Turin, the son of Giuseppe Romita, a long-time member of the Italian Socialist Party (Partito Socialista Italiano; PSI) and Minister of the Interior in 1946. During the Fascist period, he followed his father into confinement on the islands of Ustica and Ponza, and then at Veroli. In 1933 the family moved to Rome.

In 1942, aged 19, he entered the PSI and took part in the Italian resistance movement, as a member of the partisan bands operating in the Colli Albani. In 1947 he graduated in engineering and later taught Hydraulics in the Faculty of Agronomy of the University of Milan. In 1958, after the death of his father, he was elected to the Chamber of Deputies for the Italian Democratic Socialist Party (Partito Socialista Democratico Italiano; PSDI), where he remained until the end of the XI legislature in 1994.

Romita's first government positions were as undersecretary for Public Works (1963–1966), Education (1966–1968 and 1970–1972) and the Interior (1968–1969). He was subsequently the Minister of Scientific Research on three occasions, in the Andreotti II (1972–1973), Forlani (1980–1981) and Fanfani V (1982–1983) Cabinets. He was also Minister of Regional Affairs (1983–1984) and for the Budget (1984–1987) respectively in the first and second Craxi governments.

Romita was national secretary of the PSDI from 1976 to 1978, succeeding Giuseppe Saragat. In early 1989 he left the party and, together with Pietro Longo, founded the Movement of Unity and Socialist Democracy (Movimento di Unità e Democrazia Socialista; UDS), which merged later that same year with the PSI. He was Minister of Community Policies in the Andreotti VII Cabinet. After the disbandment of the PSI in 1994, he entered the newly formed Italian Socialists (SI) and then, from 1997, the Democratic Party of the Left (PDS).

Romita died in Milan in 2003.

1924 births
2003 deaths
Engineers from Turin
Italian Democratic Socialist Party politicians
Italian Socialist Party politicians
Democratic Party of the Left politicians
Italian resistance movement members
20th-century Italian politicians
20th-century Italian engineers